Council is an unincorporated community in Bladen County, North Carolina, United States. Council has a post office with ZIP code 28434.

Carver's Creek Methodist Church, located at Council, is listed on the National Register of Historic Places.

References

Unincorporated communities in Bladen County, North Carolina
Unincorporated communities in North Carolina